José Mauricio Pacini (born 8 June 1976) is an Argentine football player who most recently played for Platense F.C. in the Honduran national league.

Club career
He played in Honduras for several years. He started his career at Universidad in 1999-2000 Apertura. Later he played for Vida, C.D. Platense, F.C. Motagua, Marathón, Real España, Victoria, and Olimpia, winning the title with Platense in 2001 (2000-01 Clausura), with Motagua in 2001 (2001-02 Apertura), and with Marathón in 2003 (2002-03 Clausura). 

Pacini also participated in international club competition for several Honduran clubs, scoring for Motagua in qualifying for the 2003 CONCACAF Champions' Cup, for Marathón in the preliminary stages of the 2004 CONCACAF Champions' Cup, and for Olimpia in the quarter final stage of the 2007 CONCACAF Champions' Cup. In Argentina, he played in some clubs such as Guillermo Brown de Puerto Madryn and Defensores de Belgrano before returning to Honduras in 2011.

References

1976 births
Living people
Sportspeople from Santa Fe Province
Association football forwards
Argentine footballers
C.D.S. Vida players
Platense F.C. players
F.C. Motagua players
C.D. Marathón players
Real C.D. España players
C.D. Victoria players
C.D. Olimpia players
Expatriate footballers in Honduras
Liga Nacional de Fútbol Profesional de Honduras players